is a passenger railway station located in the town of Nagatoro, Saitama, Japan, operated by the private railway operator Chichibu Railway.

Lines

Station layout

The station is staffed and consists of one side platform and one island platform serving three tracks in total. Track 3 is a bidirectional line used by the Paleo Express, freight services and through-running services to and from the Seibu Chichibu Line.

Platforms

Adjacent stations

History

It was renamed Nagatoro from 7 July 1923.

Passenger statistics
In fiscal 2018, the station was used by an average of 1320 passengers daily.

Surrounding area
 Mount Hodosan
 Arakawa River and Nagatoro Gorge

See also
 List of railway stations in Japan

References

External links

 Nagatoro Station information (Saitama Prefectural Government) 
 Nagatoro Station timetable 

Railway stations in Saitama Prefecture
Railway stations in Japan opened in 1911
Stations of Chichibu Railway
Nagatoro, Saitama